Na Na (also known as Na-Na or NA-NAx) is a Russian boy band founded in 1989 by its manager Bari Alibasov. Some popular songs made by them include Deserted Beach and Faina.

History
In 2000 Na-Na signed a contract with Dick Clark Productions.

Members of the group were aboard Kolavia Flight 348, which burst into flames after an engine fire while taxiing for takeoff  killing three people on 1 January 2011.

References

External links
 Na-Na (NA-NAx) Official website
 Na-Na (NA-NAx) Official YouTube channel
 Sending Na-Na Into Space: CNN Story
 
  Участники группы «На-На» — о юбилейном концерте
 

Russian boy bands
Russian pop music groups
Musical groups established in 1989
Musical groups from Moscow
Soviet pop music groups